Nikita Sergeyevich Knykin (10 November 1989 – 7 September 2011) was a Russian professional ice hockey player who played in the KHL. He was killed in the 2011 Lokomotiv Yaroslavl plane crash.

Death
On 7 September 2011, Klyukin was killed when a Yakovlev Yak-42 passenger aircraft, carrying nearly his entire Lokomotiv team, crashed just outside Yaroslavl, Russia. The team was traveling to Minsk to play their opening game of the season, with its coaching staff and prospects. Lokomotiv officials said "'everyone from the main roster was on the plane plus four players from the youth team.'"

Career statistics

Regular season and playoffs

International

See also
List of ice hockey players who died during their playing career

References

External links

1989 births
2011 deaths
Lokomotiv Yaroslavl players
People from Rybinsk
Russian ice hockey centres
Victims of the Lokomotiv Yaroslavl plane crash
Sportspeople from Yaroslavl Oblast